The 2016 Morocco Tennis Tour – Meknes was a professional tennis tournament played on clay courts. It was the ninth edition of the tournament which was part of the 2016 ATP Challenger Tour. It took place in Meknes, Morocco between 12 and 17 September 2016.

Singles main-draw entrants

Seeds

 1 Rankings are as of August 29, 2016.

Other entrants
The following players received wildcards into the singles main draw:
  Ayoub Chakrouni
  Yassine Idmbarek
  Mehdi Jdi
  Amine Ahouda

The following player received entry into the singles main draw with protected ranking:
  Alberto Brizzi

The following player entered as an alternate:
  Bastián Malla

The following players received entry from the qualifying draw:
  Mario Vilella Martínez
  Linnert van der Linden
  Gibril Diarra
  Alexander Zhurbin

The following players entered as lucky losers:
  Sander Gillé
  Omar Salman
  Pol Toledo Bagué

Champions

Singles

 Maximilian Marterer def.   Uladzimir Ignatik, 7–6(7–4), 6–3.

Doubles

 Luca Margaroli /  Mohamed Safwat def.  Pedro Martínez /  Oriol Roca Batalla, 6–4, 6–4.

External links
Official Website
ITF Search
ATP official site

Morocco Tennis Tour - Meknes
Morocco Tennis Tour – Meknes
2016 Morocco Tennis Tour